Charles H. Parker (November 16, 1814 - March 3, 1890) was an American cutler, machinist and manufacturer of reapers from Beloit, Wisconsin, who served on the city council and as mayor of that city, and on the Rock County board of supervisors and spent three terms as a member of the Wisconsin State Assembly from Rock County, first as a Republican and later as a Greenbacker.

Background 
Parker was born in Newton, Massachusetts on November 16. 1814, and received a common school education. His father was a sea captain, and died when Charles was a small boy. His family moved to Dedham, Massachusetts when he was ten years old and to Canton, Massachusetts when he was sixteen. He moved to Concord, New Hampshire in 1837, where he was a cutler for some time. He "came west" in the spring of 1848, and first settled at Belvidere, Illinois, where he managed the farm of a Dr. Jonathan Stone near that city. He married Eleanor Stone, Dr. Stone's daughter (like him a native of Massachusetts, and a Universalist).

He took up work as a machinist in a Beloit reaper factory the next year for $1 a day, and would walk back home to his family in Belvidere on Friday evenings, returning to his job on the following Monday morning. In 1850 he permanently moved Eleanor and their family to Beloit. In 1852 he and his partner, brother-in-law Gustavus Stone, went into business together, building all the machinery necessary to their industry. They commenced by first making hoes and then expanding to such implements as grain sickles and blades for mowing machines. Parker would end up the president of the Parker & Stone Reaper Company. (It was while working for Parker and Stone that John Appleby developed his famous Appleby Twine Binder)

Public office 
Parker served as an alderman of the city of Beloit most of the time from 1857 into the 1880s, and was mayor in 1861. He repeatedly served as a member of the county board, and was twice elected to Rock County's 4th Assembly district (the City of Beloit, and the Towns of Beloit, Newark and Turtle) as a Republican for 1868 and 1869 (succeeding Horatio Murray). He was succeeded by fellow Republican John Hammond.

In 1876 Parker was once more elected to the Assembly, from Rock County's reapportioned 1st Assembly district (now the city of Beloit, and the Towns of Avon, Beloit, Center, Newark, Magnolia, Plymouth, Spring Valley, and Union), this time as a Greenback; he received 1,079 votes against 972 for Republican William Alcott. (Republican incumbent Sereno Merrill was not a candidate for reelection.) He was chiefly responsible for the formation of an alliance between the Greenback and Democratic members of the Assembly.

In 1878 Parker was the Greenback nominee for the Forty-Sixth Congress for the First Wisconsin District; incumbent Charles G. Williams won 14,629 votes to Parker's 9,949 (Parker was endorsed by the Democrats as well). There was no Greenback candidate for his Assembly seat, which was taken by Republican Richard Burdge.

Banking and personal life 
Parker & Stone Reaper went out of business in 1878, and the business eventually was taken over by his son Lowell Holden Parker and a partner, who ended up moving the factory to Milwaukee in 1881, where it became known as "Milwaukee Harvester" until after its 1902 purchase by International Harvester. Holden sold his interest, and returned to Beloit, where father and son opened the Second National Bank of Beloit, of which Charles remained president until his death on March 14, 1890. (Eleanor would die March 24, 1900, at the age of 81.) L. Holden Parker would succeed his father as president of the bank; and would eventually serve one term (as a Republican) in the Assembly district which included Beloit.

References 

1814 births
1890 deaths
American bankers
County supervisors in Wisconsin
Cutlers
Machinists
Mayors of places in Wisconsin
Republican Party members of the Wisconsin State Assembly
Politicians from Beloit, Wisconsin
Wisconsin city council members
Wisconsin Greenbacks
19th-century American politicians
Businesspeople from Wisconsin
Politicians from Dedham, Massachusetts
19th-century American businesspeople